The Fred Korematsu Day of Civil Liberties and the Constitution is celebrated on January 30 in California and a growing number of additional states to commemorate the birthday of Fred Korematsu, a Japanese-American civil rights activist best known for resisting the internment of Japanese Americans (see Korematsu v. US). It also recognizes American civil liberties and rights under the Constitution of the United States. It is the first day in U.S. history named after an Asian American.

History 
Legislation establishing Fred Korematsu Day was first signed into law by New York City in 2008 and then-governor of California, Arnold Schwarzenegger, on September 23, 2010. The legislation passed unanimously in both the Assembly and Senate. 

It was first officially commemorated in 2011 at the University of California, Berkeley. Educational materials were also distributed to school teachers for classroom use.

The U.S. Commission on Civil Rights recommended that a national Fred Korematsu Day be established as a national holiday in 2015.

Additional States 
Since passage in California, Fred Korematsu Day has also been recognized in additional states. 

The states of Hawaii (2013), Virginia (2015), Florida (2016), New York (2018) and Arizona (2021) are among the states who have recognized Fred Korematsu Day in perpetuity by legislation.

Fred Korematsu Day was also celebrated in Illinois in 2014, but it isn't clear whether then-governor Pat Quinn's proclamation extended past the year. Georgia, Michigan, Pennsylvania, and Utah have also submitted resolutions honoring the day while South Carolina has submitted a bill to their legislature.

Other Commemorations 

Google recognized Fred Korematsu Day in 2017 with a Google Doodle by artist Sophie Diao, featuring a patriotic portrait of Korematsu wearing his Presidential Medal of Freedom, a scene of the internment camps to his back, surrounded by cherry blossoms, flowers that have come to be symbols of peace and friendship between the US and Japan.

See also
 Day of Remembrance (Japanese Americans)
 Bainbridge Island Japanese American Exclusion Memorial
 Empty Chair Memorial
 Go for Broke Monument
 Harada House
 Japanese American Memorial to Patriotism During World War II
 National Japanese American Veterans Memorial Court
 Sakura Square

References

Events in California
History of civil rights in the United States
January observances
2011 establishments in California